JGT may refer to:

 Journal of Graph Theory
 Journal of Graphics Tools
 Journal of Group Theory